The Acadians are the descendants of 17th and 18th century French settlers in parts of Acadia (French: Acadie)  in the northeastern region of North America comprising what is now the Canadian Maritime Provinces of New Brunswick, Nova Scotia and Prince Edward Island, the Gaspé peninsula in eastern Québec, and the Kennebec River in southern Maine. The settlers whose descendants became Acadians primarily came from the southwestern and southern regions of France, historically known as Occitania, while some Acadians are claimed to be descended from the Indigenous peoples of the region. Today, due to assimilation, some Acadians may share other ethnic ancestries as well.

The history of the Acadians was significantly influenced by the six colonial wars that took place in Acadia during the 17th and 18th centuries (see the four French and Indian Wars, Father Rale's War and Father Le Loutre's War). Eventually, the last of the colonial wars—the French and Indian War—resulted in the British Expulsion of the Acadians from the region. After the war, many Acadians came out of hiding or returned to Acadia from the British colonies. Others remained in France and some migrated from there to Louisiana, where they became known as Cajuns, a corruption of the word Acadiens or Acadians. The nineteenth century saw the beginning of the Acadian Renaissance and the publication of Evangeline, which helped galvanize Acadian identity. In the last century, Acadians have made achievements in the areas of equal language and cultural rights as a minority group in the Maritime Provinces of Canada.

As French settlers

Port Royal Habitation (1604-1613)

Pierre Dugua, Sieur de Monts built the Habitation at Port-Royal in 1605 as a replacement for his initial attempt at colonizing Saint Croix Island (present day Maine). The trading monopoly of de Monts was cancelled in 1607, and most of the French settlers returned to France, although some remained. Jean de Biencourt de Poutrincourt et de Saint-Just led a second expedition to Port Royal in 1610.

Arrival of the first European families
The survival of the Acadian settlements was based on successful cooperation with the Indigenous peoples of the region. In the early years of Acadian settlement, this included recorded marriages between Acadian settlers and Indigenous women. Some records have survived showing marriages between Acadian settlers and Indigenous women in formal Roman Catholic rites, for example, the marriage of Charles La Tour to a Mi'kmaw woman in 1626. There were also reported instances of Acadian settlers marrying Indigenous spouses according to Marriage à la façon du pays, and subsequently living in Mi'kmaq communities. Settlers also brought French wives with them to Acadia, such as La Tour's second wife, Françoise-Marie Jacquelin, who joined him in Acadia in 1640.

Governor Isaac de Razilly's administration at LaHave, Nova Scotia, prepared the ground for the arrival of the first recorded migrant families on board the Saint Jehan, which left La Rochelle on 1 April 1636.  There were a number of sailings from the French Atlantic Coast to Acadia between 1632 and 1636, but this is the only one for which a detailed passenger list has survived.   Nicolas Denys, who was stationed across the LaHave River at Port Rossignol (Liverpool Bay), acted as agent for the Saint Jehan.  After a 35-day crossing of the Atlantic, the Saint Jehan arrived on 6 May 1636 at LaHave, Nova Scotia.  There were seventy-eight passengers and eighteen crew members. With this ship, Acadia began a slow shift from being primarily a matter of explorers and traders, of men, to a colony of permanent settlers, including women and children. While the presence of European women is a signal that settlement was seriously contemplated, there were yet so few of them in this group of migrants that they did not immediately affect the status of Acadia as basically a colony of European transients. By the end of the year, the migrants were moved from LaHave and re-established at Port Royal. At Port Royal in 1636, Pierre Martin and Catherine Vigneau, who had arrived on the Saint Jehan, were the first European parents to have a child in Acadia.  The first-born child was Mathieu Martin. In part because of this distinction, Mathieu Martin later became the Seigneury of Cobequid (1699).

Kennedy (2014) argues that the emigrants from the Vienne and Aquitaine regions of France carried to Acadia their customs and social structure. They were frontier people, who dispersed their settlements based on kinship. They optimized the use of farmland and emphasized trading for a profit.  They were hierarchical and politically active. The French and the Acadian villages were similar in terms of prosperity,  egalitarianism, and independent-mindedness. The emergence of a distinct Acadian identity emerged from the adaptation of traditional French methods, institutions, and ideas to the Indigenous North American methods, ideas, and political situations.

Civil war 

With the death of Isaac de Razilly, Acadia was plunged into what some historians have described as a civil war (1640–1645).  Acadia had two legitimate Lieutenant Governors. The war was between Port Royal, where Governor Charles de Menou d'Aulnay de Charnisay was stationed, and present-day Saint John, New Brunswick, where Governor Charles de Saint-Étienne de la Tour was stationed.

In the war, there were four major battles. La Tour attacked d'Aulnay at Port Royal in 1640. In response to the attack, D'Aulnay sailed out of Port Royal to establish a five-month blockade of La Tour's fort at Saint John, which La Tour eventually defeated (1643).  La Tour attacked d'Aulnay again at Port Royal in 1643. D'Aulnay and Port Royal ultimately won the war against La Tour with the 1645 siege of Saint John. After d'Aulnay died (1650), La Tour re-established himself in Acadia.

English colony (1654–1667)
In 1654, war between France and England broke out. Led by Major Robert Sedgwick, a flotilla from Boston, under orders from Cromwell, arrived in Acadia to chase the French out. The flotilla seized La Tour's fort, then Port-Royal. La Tour, nevertheless, managed to find himself in England, where, with the support of John Kirke, succeeded in receiving from Cromwell a part of Acadia, along with Sir Thomas Temple. La Tour returned to Cap-de-Sable where he remained until his death in 1666 at the age of 73.

During the English occupation of Acadia, Jean-Baptiste Colbert, Louis XIV's minister, forbade the Acadians from returning to France. 
As a result of the English occupation, no new French families settled in Acadia between 1654 and 1670.

Post Treaty of Breda

The Treaty of Breda, signed 31 July 1667, returned Acadia to France. A year later, Marillon du Bourg arrived to take possession of the territory for France. The son of LeBorgne, Alexandre LeBorgne, was named provisionary governor and lieutenant-general of Acadia. He married Marie Motin-La Tour, the eldest child of the marriage between La Tour and d'Aulnay's widow.

In 1670, the new governor of Acadia, the chevalier Hubert d'Andigny, chevalier de Grandfontaine, was responsible for the first census undertaken in Acadia. The results did not include those Acadians living with local First Nations. It revealed that there were approximately sixty Acadian families with approximately 300 inhabitants in total. These inhabitants were predominantly engaged in aboiteau farming along the shores of the present-day Bay of Fundy. No serious attempt was made to increase the population of Acadia.

In the spring of 1671, more than fifty colonists left La Rochelle aboard the l'Oranger. Others arrived from Canada (New France) or were retired soldiers. During this time, a number of colonists married with the local First Nations. Some of the first to marry were Charles de Saint-Étienne de La Tour, Martin, Pierré Lejeune–Briard, Jehan Lambert, Petitpas and Guedry. The captain, Vincent de Saint-Castin, the commander at Pentagoet, married Marie Pidikiwamiska, the daughter of an Abenakis chief.

In 1674, the Dutch briefly conquered Acadia, renaming the colony New Holland.

During the last decades of the seventeenth century, Acadians migrated from the capital, Port Royal, and established what would become the other major Acadian settlements before the Expulsion of the Acadians: Grand Pré, Chignecto, Cobequid and Pisiguit.
Although not common, on occasion epidemics ravished the population of Ile St.-Jean, Ile Royale and Acadia. In 1732/33 more than 150 people died of smallpox on Ile Royale.

The history of the settlers of Ile St.-Jean prior to the expulsion includes extreme hardship. For almost every good harvest year it seems that there was one in which crops failed. In one or two instances widespread fires destroyed crops, livestock and farms. Famine and starvation were common and frequently occasioned desperate pleas for supplies from Louisbourg, Québec and even France itself. In 1756, famine on Ile St.-Jean prompted authorities to relocate some families to Québec.

Prior to the founding of Halifax (1749), Port Royal/ Annapolis Royal was the capital of Acadia and later Nova Scotia for most of the previous 150 years.  During that time the British made six attempts to conquer Acadia by defeating the capital. They finally defeated the French in the Siege of Port Royal (1710).  Over the following fifty years, the French and their allies made six unsuccessful military attempts to regain the capital.

Colonial Wars 
  

There was already a long history of Acadian and Wabanaki Confederacy resistance to the British occupation of Acadia during the four French and Indian Wars and two local wars (Father Rale's War and Father Le Loutre's War) before the Expulsion of the Acadians. The Mi'kmaq and the Acadians were allies through Catholicism and through numerous inter-marriages. The Mi'kmaq held the military strength in Acadia even after the conquest of 1710. They primarily resisted the British occupation of Acadia and were joined in their efforts on numerous occasions by Acadians.

While many Acadians traded with the New England Protestants, Acadians' participation in the wars clearly indicated that many were reluctant to be ruled by the British. During the first colonial war, King William's War (1688–97), the crews of the very successful French privateer Pierre Maisonnat dit Baptiste were primarily Acadian. The Acadians resisted during the Raid on Chignecto (1696). During Queen Anne's War, Mi’kmaq and Acadians resisted during the Raid on Grand Pré, Piziquid and Chignecto in 1704. The Acadians also assisted the French in protecting the capital in the Siege of Port Royal (1707) and the final Conquest of Acadia. The Acadians and Mi’kmaq were also successful in the Battle of Bloody Creek (1711).

During Father Rale's War, the Maliseet raided numerous vessels on the Bay of Fundy while the Mi'kmaq engaged in the Raid on Canso, Nova Scotia (1723). In the latter engagement, the Mi'kmaq were aided by Acadians. During King George's War, Abbe Jean-Louis Le Loutre led many efforts which involved both Acadians and Mi’kmaq to recapture the capital such as the Siege of Annapolis Royal (1744). During this siege, French officer Marin had taken British prisoners and stopped with them further up the bay at Cobequid. While at Cobequid, an Acadian said that the French soldiers should have "left their [the English] carcasses behind and brought their skins". Le Loutre was also joined by prominent Acadian resistance leader Joseph Broussard (Beausoleil). Broussard and other Acadians were involved in supporting the French soldiers in the Battle of Grand Pré.

During Father Le Loutre’s War, the conflict continued. The Mi'kmaq attacked New England Rangers in the Siege of Grand Pré and Battle at St. Croix. Upon the founding of Dartmouth, Nova Scotia, Broussard and the Mi'kmaq conducted numerous raids on the village, such as the Raid on Dartmouth (1751), to try to stop the Protestant migration into Nova Scotia. (Similarly, during the French and Indian War, Mi’kmaq, Acadians and Maliseet also engaged in numerous raids on Lunenburg, Nova Scotia, to stop the migration, such as the Raid on Lunenburg (1756).) Le Loutre and Broussard also worked together to resist the British occupation of Chignecto (1750) and then later they fought together with Acadians in the Battle of Beausejour (1755). (As early as the summer of 1751, La Valiere reported, approximately 250 Acadians had already enrolled in the local militia at Fort Beausejour.)

When Charles Lawrence took over the post following Hopson’s return to England, he took a stronger stance. He was not only a government official but a military leader for the region. Lawrence came up with a military solution for the forty-five years of an unsettled British conquest of Acadia. The French and Indian War (and Seven Years' War in Europe) began in 1754. Lawrence's primary objectives in Acadia were to defeat the French fortifications at Beausejour and Louisbourg. The British saw many Acadians as a military threat in their allegiance to the French and Mi'kmaq. The British also wanted to interrupt the Acadian supply lines to Fortress Louisbourg, which, in turn, supplied the Mi'kmaq.

French and Indian War

The British Conquest of Acadia happened in 1710. Over the next forty-five years the Acadians refused to sign an unconditional oath of allegiance to Britain. During this time period Acadians participated in various militia operations against the British and maintained vital supply lines to the French Fortress of Louisbourg and Fort Beausejour. During the French and Indian War, the British sought to neutralize any military threat Acadians posed and to interrupt the vital supply lines Acadians provided to Louisbourg by deporting Acadians from Acadia.

Many Acadians might have signed an unconditional oath to the British monarchy had the circumstances been better, while other Acadians did not sign because they were clearly anti-British. For the Acadians who might have signed an unconditional oath, there were numerous reasons why they did not. The difficulty was partly religious, in that the British monarch was the head of the (Protestant) Church of England. Another significant issue was that an oath might commit male Acadians to fight against France during wartime. A related concern was whether their Mi'kmaq neighbours might perceive this as acknowledging the British claim to Acadia rather than the Mi'kmaq. As a result, signing an unconditional oath might have put Acadian villages in danger of attack from Mi'kmaq.

In the Grand Dérangement (the Great Upheaval), more than 12,000 Acadians (three-fourths of the Acadian population in Nova Scotia) were expelled from the colony between 1755 and 1764. The British destroyed around 6,000 Acadian houses and dispersed the Acadians among the Thirteen Colonies from Massachusetts to Georgia. The single event that involved the most deaths of Acadians was the sinking of the Duke William. Although there were no purposeful attempts to separate families, this did occur in the chaos of the eviction.

Acadian and Mi’kmaq resistance 

With the Expulsion of the Acadians during the French and Indian War, the Mi’kmaq and Acadian resistance intensified.  After the Expulsion began, much of the resistance was led by Charles Deschamps de Boishébert et de Raffetot. The Acadians and Mi’kmaq again engaged victoriously in the Battle of Petitcodiac (1755) and the Battle of Bloody Creek (1757).  Acadians who were being deported from Annapolis Royal, Nova Scotia, on the ship Pembroke defeated the British crew and sailed to land. There was also resistance during the St. John River Campaign.  Boishebert also ordered the Raid on Lunenburg (1756).  In the spring of 1756, a wood-gathering party from Fort Monckton (former Fort Gaspareaux), was ambushed and nine of them were scalped.

In the April 1757, a band of Acadian and Mi'kmaq raided a warehouse near Fort Edward, killing thirteen British soldiers and, after taking what provisions they could carry, setting fire to the building.  A few days later, the same partisans also raided Fort Cumberland.

Some Acadians escaped into the woods and lived with the Mi'kmaq; some bands of partisans fought the British, including a group led by Joseph Broussard, known as "Beausoleil", along the Petitcodiac River of New Brunswick. Some followed the coast northward, facing famine and disease. Some were recaptured, facing deportation or imprisonment at Fort Beausejour (renamed Fort Cumberland) until 1763.

Some Acadians became indentured servants in the British colonies. Massachusetts passed a law in November 1755 placing the Acadians under the custody of "justices of the peace and overseers of the poor"; Pennsylvania, Maryland, and Connecticut adopted similar laws. The Province of Virginia under Robert Dinwiddie initially agreed to resettle about one thousand Acadians who arrived in the colony but later ordered most deported to England, writing that the "French people" were "intestine enemies" that were "murdering and scalping our frontier Settlers".

In 1758, after the fall of Louisbourg, over 3,000 Acadians were deported to northern France.  Resettlement attempts were tried in Châtellerault,  Nantes, and Belle Île off Brittany. The French islands of St. Pierre and Miquelon near Newfoundland became a safe harbor for many Acadian families until they were once again deported by the British in 1778 and 1793.

Re-establishing in Nova Scotia
After the end of the Seven Years' War in 1763, Acadians were allowed to return to Nova Scotia as long as they did not settle in any one area in large numbers; they were not permitted to resettle in the areas of Port Royal or Grand-Pré. Some Acadians resettled along the Nova Scotia coast and remain scattered across Nova Scotia to this day. Many dispersed Acadians looked for other homes. Beginning in 1764, groups of Acadians began to arrive in Louisiana (which had passed to Spanish control in 1762). They eventually became known as Cajuns.

Beginning in the 1770s, many Acadians were encouraged to return through the policies of Nova Scotia Governor Michael Francklin, who guaranteed Catholic worship, land grants and issued a promise that there would be no second expulsion (At this time, Nova Scotia included present-day New Brunswick). However the fertile Acadian dykelands had been resettled by New England Planters, who were soon followed by Loyalists who further occupied former Acadian lands. Returning Acadians and those families who had escaped expulsion had to settle in other parts of Nova Scotia and New Brunswick, in most cases isolated and infertile lands. The new Acadian settlements were forced to focus more on fishery and later forestry.

Milestones of Acadian return and resettlement included:

1767 St. Pierre et Miquelon
1772 census
1774 Founding of Saint-Anne's church; the Acadian school at Rustico and the abbey Jean-Louis Beaubien; the Trappistines in Tracadie
1785 Displacement from Fort Sainte-Anne to the upper Saint John River valley (Madawaska)

Nineteenth century 
Milestones of Acadian return and resettlement included:
 Jean-Mandé Sigogne (6 April 1763 – 9 November 1844) was a French Catholic priest, who moved to Canada after the Revolution and became known for his missionary work among the Acadians of Nova Scotia.
1836 Simon d'Entremont and Frédéric Robichaud, MLAs in N.S.
1846 Amand Landry, MLA in N.B.
1847, Longfellow publishes Evangeline
1854, Stanislaw-Francois Poirier, MLA in P.E.I
1854, the seminary Saint-Thomas in Memramcook, New Brunswick, becomes the first upper-level school for Acadians
1859, the first history of Acadia is published in French by Edme Rameau de Saint-Père; Acadians begin to become aware of their own existence

Acadian renaissance

1864 founding of the Farmers' Bank of Rustico, the earliest known community bank in Canada, under the leadership of Rev. Georges-Antoine Belcourt
1867, first Acadian newspaper, Le Moniteur Acadien (The Acadian Monitor) is published by Israël Landry
1871, Common Schools Act of 1871 prohibiting the teaching of religion in the classroom
1875, the death of Louis Mailloux, 19 years old, in Caraquet by government forces only stokes Acadian nationalism
1880, the Society of Saint John the Baptiste invites Francophones from all over North America to a congress in Quebec City
July 20–21, 1881, Acadian leaders organize the first Acadian National Convention in Memramcook, New Brunswick, which had for its goal to take care of the general interests of the Acadian population. More than 5,000 Acadians participated in the convention. It was decided that August 15, the Feast of the Assumption of the Virgin Mary, would be chosen to celebrate Acadian culture as National Acadian Day. Other debates at the convention centered around education, agriculture, emigration, colonization, and newspapers, and these same issues would arise at subsequent conventions.
At the second convention, on August 15, 1884, in Miscouche, Prince Edward Island, the  Acadian flag, an anthem - Ave Maris Stella, and a motto - L'union fait la force were adopted. 
1885, John A. Macdonald nominates Pascal Poirier from Shediac as the first Acadian senator; a second Acadian newspaper published, Le Courrier des Provinces Maritimes
1887, the newspaper L'Evangéline begins being published from Digby, later, in 1905, moves to Moncton
1890, third Acadian convention

Twentieth century 
Milestones of the Acadian Renaissance
 1912, Monsigneur Edouard LeBlanc is the first Acadian bishop in The Maritimes
 1917, the Conservative Aubin-Edmond Arsenault becomes the first Acadian premier of P.E.I.
 1920, 2nd Acadian bishop, Mgr Alexandre Chiasson in Chatham and later Bathurst; la Société nationale de l'Assomption undertakes a campaign to build a commemorative church in Grand-Pré, Nova Scotia
 1923, Pierre-Jean Véniot becomes the first Acadian premier of N.B. but was not elected
 1936, the first Caisse Populaire Acadien in Petit-Rocher is founded; the committee France-Acadie is founded
 1955, the first Tintamarre occurs.

The Equal Opportunity program
Louis Robichaud, popularly known as "P'tit-Louis" (Little Louis), was the first elected Acadian Premier of New Brunswick, serving from 1960 to 1970. First elected to the legislature in 1952, he became provincial Liberal leader in 1958 and led his party to victory in 1960, 1963, and 1967.

Robichaud modernized the province's hospitals and public schools and introduced a wide range of reforms in an era that became known as the New Brunswick Equal Opportunity program, at the same time as the Quiet Revolution in Québec. To carry out these reforms, Robichaud restructured the municipal tax regime, expanded the government and sought to ensure that the quality of health care, education and social services was the same across the province—a programme he called equal opportunity, is still a buzzword in New Brunswick.

Critics accused of Robichaud's government of "robbing Peter to pay Pierre" with the assumption being that rich municipalities were Anglophone ones and poor municipalities were Francophone ones. While it was true that the wealthier municipalities were predominantly in certain English-speaking areas, areas with significantly inferior services were to be found across the province in all municipalities.

Robichaud was instrumental in the formation of New Brunswick's only French-speaking university, the Université de Moncton, in 1963, which serves the Acadian population of the Maritime provinces.

His government also passed the New Brunswick Official Languages Act (1969) making the province officially bilingual. "Language rights", he said when he introduced the legislation, "are more than legal rights. They are precious cultural rights, going deep into the revered past and touching the historic traditions of all our people."

1977, official opening of the Acadian Historic Village in Caraquet, New Brunswick.

Antonine Maillet 
Born 1929 in Bouctouche, Antonine Maillet is an Acadian novelist, playwright, and scholar. Maillet received a BA and MA from the Université de Moncton, followed by a Ph.D. in literature in 1970 from the Université Laval. Maillet won the 1972 Governor General's Award for Fiction for Don l'Orignal. In 1979, Maillet published Pélagie-la-Charrette, for which she won the prix Goncourt.  Maillet's character "La Sagouine" (from her book of the same name) is the inspiration for "Le Pays de la Sagouine" in her hometown of Bouctouche.

Twenty-first century
In 2003, at the request of Acadian representatives, a proclamation was issued in the name of Queen Elizabeth II, as the Canadian monarch, officially acknowledging the deportation and establishing July 28 as a day of commemoration. The day of commemoration is observed by the Government of Canada, as the successor of the British Government.

Acadian Remembrance Day 
The Fédération des Associations de Familles Acadiennnes of New Brunswick and the Société Saint-Thomas d'Aquin of Prince Edward Island has resolved that December 13 each year shall be commemorated as "Acadian Remembrance Day" in remembrance of all Acadians who died as a result of the deportation. The date December 13 was chosen to commemorate the sinking of the Duke William and the nearly 2000 Acadians deported from Île-Saint Jean who perished in the North Atlantic from hunger, disease and drowning in 1758. The event has been commemorated annually since 2004 and participants mark the event by wearing a black star.

Acadian World Congress 
Beginning in 1994, the Acadian community gathered for an Acadian World Congress in New Brunswick. The congress has been held every 5 years since then: in Louisiana in 1999, in Nova Scotia in 2004, in the Acadian Peninsula of New Brunswick in 2009. The 5th Acadian World Congress was hosted in 2014 by a gathering of 40 different communities located in three different provinces and different states in two countries.  Northwestern New Brunswick and Témiscouata, Quebec, in Canada as well as Northern Maine in the United States joined hands to host the 5th CMA.

See also

Military history of the Acadians
Military history of Nova Scotia
Acadians
Cajun
Occitans
Fort Beauséjour and Fortress of Louisbourg
Henri Peyroux de la Coudreniere
List of governors of Acadia
List of conflicts in Canada
Military history of Canada
Southern France
New Brunswick
Nova Scotia
Prince Edward Island
List of years in Canada
History of Nova Scotia

Notes

Citations

References 
 Arsenault, B. (1994). Histoire des Acadiens. Gasp: Fides.
 
Dupont, Jean-Claude (1977). Héritage d'Acadie. Montreal: Éditions Leméac.

External links 
 Thematic project on the Acadians at the Dictionary of Canadian Biography
Acadian Ancestral Home - a repository for Acadian History & Genealogy
Poitou, Acadie, Bretagne
Acadian-Cajun Genealogy & History
CyberAcadie — Site Web sur l'histoire des Acadiens
Le Pays De La Sagouine

Further reading

  (published in the United States as )
 

Culture of Nova Scotia
Conflicts in Nova Scotia
History of Nova Scotia